Tennyson Botes (born 16 August 1988) is a South African cricketer. He played in three first-class matches for Boland in 2007.

See also
 List of Boland representative cricketers

References

External links
 

1988 births
Living people
South African cricketers
Boland cricketers
Cricketers from East London, Eastern Cape